Nic Sheff is an American writer. He is the author of two memoirs, including the New York Times best seller Tweak: Growing Up On Methamphetamines and We All Fall Down: Living With Addiction. He has also written several novels for young adults and is a writer, story editor, and co-producer for the Netflix series 13 Reasons Why.

Personal life
As of 2011, Sheff lives with his wife in Los Angeles.

Bibliography

Memoirs
Tweak: Growing Up On Methamphetamines (2008, Atheneum Books for Young Readers)
We All Fall Down: Living With Addiction (2011, Little, Brown Books for Young Readers)

Novels
Schizo (2014, Philomel Books)
Harmony House (2016, HarperTeen)

Related works
Sheff is the subject of his father David Sheff's memoir, Beautiful Boy: A Father's Journey Through His Son's Addiction, and was a consultant on its 2018 film adaptation, in which he was portrayed by Timothée Chalamet. For his performance Chalamet was nominated for a Golden Globe Award, Screen Actors Guild Award, and BAFTA Award, all for Best Actor in a Supporting Role.

References

External links 

21st-century American memoirists
21st-century American novelists
American writers of young adult literature
American television writers
Writers on addiction
American people of Jewish descent
Year of birth missing (living people)
Living people